Murrayville is a small community in the Township of Langley in the Lower Mainland region of British Columbia, Canada.

History

In 1870, Paul Murray settled in this location and together with his sons owned a quarter section of land on each of the four corners of Yale Road and what now is 216th Street.  This area became known as "Murrays corner" after Alexander Murray, who drowned in the Fraser River in January 1884 while attempting in vain to save a friend. Originally Murray was buried at the Fort Langley Cemetery but when the Odd Fellows Cemetery opened his family exhumed his body and relocated it so that he would be closer to home.

In 1925, the post office named it "Murrayville".  The area between 216 street, 216a street, 48th ave and 48A avenue is one of  the oldest subdivisions in Langley.  Of the eight building lots in this subdivision there are still 6 heritage houses (built before 1930).

Features

Murrayville is the location of the Township of Langley Operations Centre, Royal Canadian Mounted Police offices, and the Langley school board office.

The neighbourhood is home to the W.C. Blair Recreation Centre, which houses a wave pool with six 25m swimming lanes and a shallow children's area, as well as a sauna and hot tub. The building also contains a  Fitness Room, a  weight room, a meeting room, and a multi-purpose room.

Among the historical buildings is an old church building that is currently being used by Holy Nativity Orthodox Church, and the Murrayville Community Hall which has been recently renovated inside to try and bring back some heritage aesthetic. The hall was originally donated by P.Y. Porter and is now used by area residents to hold many different types of functions.

Education
Served by School District 35 Langley, Murrayville has two elementary schools and one high school; James Hill Elementary School, Langley Fundamental Elementary School, and Langley Secondary School. The historic garage has been restored to home the Langley Montessori Elementary School and Early Learning Centre. It also has a Christian elementary and secondary school: Credo Christian Elementary School and Credo Christian High School.

Businesses
Murrayville has various businesses, such as:
McDonald's
A&W
Subway
Ricky's All Day Grill
IGA
Shoppers Drug Mart.

Famous residents
Robb Gordon
Danny Lorenz
Ben Heppner
Mitchell Purcha
Taylor Shale
Lee Wettlaufer

References

Neighbourhoods in Langley, British Columbia
Langley, British Columbia (district municipality)